"Bald" is a song by the English rock band The Darkness.

Background and release history
The song is a hilarious melodrama about a rock god's worst nightmare, according to Rolling Stone magazine.

In another review, Rolling Stone states that the song is "about premature hair loss". 

Stylus states that the song is about "losing your edge".

Justin Hawkins commented on the song saying ""The irony of it is that it's a super-powerful song about losing your virility,"

It is the seventh track in the band's sophomore album One Way Ticket to Hell... and Back, clocking in at five minutes thirty-one seconds, making it the longest song on the album. The song was recorded  at Chapel Studios, South Thoresby, Lincolnshire; Paul Smith Music Studios, London.

Release history
The song has been released in three different albums:

On 28 November 2005 on the band's second album One Way Ticket to Hell... and Back.

On 1 April 2008 in the first compilation album "The Platinum Collection".

On 4 August 2008 in the second compilation album "2 in 1: Permission to Land/One Way Ticket to Hell".

Critical reception
Rolling Stone called it the "best song on the Darkness' eccentrically flawed second album". 

Pitchfork Media praised the song for exploring new territory, but ultimately concluded that the song was undercooked. 

Drowned in Sound stated "The chorus is sung in the staccato tradition of oddball duo Sparks (whose _‘This Town etc’_ Justin covered on his summer solo release) and the accompanying guitars are of the have-a-go-hero variety. Essentially love on the rocks with no hair."

Personnel
Justin Hawkins – vocals, lead and rhythm guitar, synthesizer, piano
Dan Hawkins – rhythm and lead guitar, bass
Ed Graham – drums
Additional personnel
Pedro Ferreira – production, mixing, engineering
Mike Marsh – mastering
Will Bartle – recording assistance
Nick Taylor – mixing assistance

References

The Darkness (band) songs
Songs written by Justin Hawkins
2005 songs
Song recordings produced by Roy Thomas Baker
Songs written by Ed Graham
Songs written by Dan Hawkins (musician)